Ruyigi Province is one of the 18 provinces of Burundi.

Communes
It is divided administratively into the following communes:

 Commune of Butaganzwa
 Commune of Butezi
 Commune of Bweru
 Commune of Gisuru
 Commune of Kinyinya
 Commune of Nyabitsinda
 Commune of Ruyigi

 
Provinces of Burundi